Allah Rakha Rahman (born A. S. Dileep Kumar; 6 January 1967) is an Indian music composer, record producer, singer and songwriter, popular for his works in Indian cinema; predominantly in Tamil and Hindi films, with occasional forays in international cinema, as well as an arrangement of the 20th Century Studios fanfare for Star Studios. He is a winner of six National Film Awards, two Academy Awards, two Grammy Awards, a BAFTA Award, a Golden Globe Award, fifteen Filmfare Awards and seventeen Filmfare Awards South. In 2010, the Indian government conferred him with the Padma Bhushan, the nation's third-highest civilian award.

Rahman initially composed scores for different documentaries and jingles for advertisements and Indian television channels. With his in-house studio Panchathan Record Inn, Rahman's film-scoring career began during the early 1990s with the Tamil film Roja.  Following that, he went on to score several songs for Tamil language films, including Ratnam's politically charged Bombay, the urban Kadhalan, Thiruda Thiruda, and S. Shankar's debut film Gentleman. Rahman's score for his first Hollywood film, the comedy Couples Retreat (2009), won the BMI Award for Best Score. His music for Slumdog Millionaire (2008) earned him Best Original Score and Best Original Song at the 81st Academy Awards. He was also awarded Best Compilation Soundtrack Album and Best Song Written for Visual Media at the 2010 Grammy Awards. He is nicknamed "Isai Puyal" (musical storm) and "Mozart of Madras".

Rahman has also become a humanitarian and philanthropist, donating and raising money for a number of causes and charities. In 2006, he was honoured by Stanford University for his contributions to global music. In 2008, he received Lifetime Achievement Award from the Rotary Club of Madras. In 2009, he was included on the Time list of the world's 100 most influential people. In 2013, he introduced 7.1 surround sound technology to South Indian films. In 2014, he was awarded an honorary doctorate from Berklee College of Music. He has also received honorary doctorate from Aligarh Muslim University. In 2017, he made his debut as a director and writer for the film Le Musk.

Early life
Allah Rakha Rahman was born as A. S. Dileep Kumar in Madras, Tamil Nadu, on 6 January 1967. His father, R. K. Shekhar from a Mudaliar family, was a film-score composer and conductor for Tamil and Malayalam films. Rahman began studying piano at age four. He assisted his father in the studio, playing the keyboard.

After his father's death when Rahman was nine years old, the rental of his father's musical equipment provided his family's income. Raised by his mother, Kareema (born Kashturi), Rahman, who was studying in Padma Seshadri Bala Bhavan had to work to support his family, which led to him to routinely miss classes and fail exams. In an interview in 2012, Rahman said that his mother was summoned and was told to take him to the streets of Kodambakkam to beg and not to send him to the school anymore.

Rahman attended another school called MCN for a year, and later joined the Madras Christian College Higher Secondary School, where he was admitted on his music talent and formed a band with his high school classmates. However, after discussing with his mother, he later dropped out of school to pursue a career as a full-time musician. 
Rahman was a keyboard player and arranger for bands such as Roots (with childhood friend and percussionist Sivamani, John Anthony, Suresh Peters, JoJo and Raja) and founded the Chennai-based rock group Nemesis Avenue. He mastered the keyboard, piano, synthesizer, harmonium and guitar, and was particularly interested in the synthesizer because it was the "ideal combination of music and technology".

Rahman began his early musical training under Master Dhanraj, and at age 11 began playing in the orchestra of Malayalam composer (and close friend of his father) M. K. Arjunan. He soon began working with other composers, such as M. S. Viswanathan, Vijaya Bhaskar, Ilaiyaraaja, Ramesh Naidu, Vijay Anand, Hamsalekha and Raj–Koti, accompanied Zakir Hussain, Kunnakudi Vaidyanathan and L. Shankar on world tours and obtained a scholarship from Trinity College London to the Trinity College of Music. During his early career, Rahman had assisted many music directors to play keyboard and synthesizer. One of the notable works includes a Malayalam film, Ramji Rao Speaking released in 1989 where Rahman and Sivamani programmed a song called "Kalikalam" for the music director S.Balakrishnan. 

Studying in Madras, Rahman graduated with a diploma in Western classical music from the school. Rahman was introduced to Qadiri tariqa when his younger sister was seriously ill in 1984. His mother was a practising Hindu. At the age of 23, he converted to Islam with other members of his family in 1989, changing his name to Allah Rakha Rahman (A. R. Rahman).

Career

Soundtracks
Rahman initially composed scores for different documentaries and jingles for advertisements and Indian television channels. In 1987 Rahman, then still known as Dileep, composed jingles for a line of watches introduced by Allwyn. He also arranged the jingles for some advertisements that went on to become very popular, including the popular jingle for Titan Watches, in which he used the theme from Mozart's Symphony no.25. In 1992, he was approached by director Mani Ratnam to compose the score and soundtrack for his Tamil film, Roja.

Rahman's film career began in 1992 when he started Panchathan Record Inn, a recording and mixing studio in his backyard. It would become the most-advanced recording studio in India, and arguably one of Asia's most sophisticated and high-tech studios. Cinematographer Santosh Sivan signed Rahman for his second film Yoddha, a Malayalam film starring Mohanlal and directed by Sivan's brother Sangeeth Sivan that released in September 1992.

The following year, Rahman received the National Film Awards (Silver Lotus) award for best music director at the National Film Awards for Roja. The films' score was critically and commercially successful in its original and dubbed versions, led by the innovative theme "Chinna Chinna Aasai". Rahman followed this with successful scores and songs for Tamil–language films for the Chennai film industry, including Ratnam's politically charged Bombay, Thiruda Thiruda and S. Shankar's debut film Gentleman (with its popular dance song, "Chikku Bukku Rayile"), the urban Kadhalan. Rahman collaborated with director Bharathiraaja on Kizhakku Cheemayile and Karuththamma, producing successful Tamil rural folk-inspired film songs; he also composed for K. Balachander's Duet, which had some memorable Saxophone themes. The 1995 film Indira and romantic comedies Mr. Romeo and Love Birds also drew attention.

Rahman attracted a Japanese audience with Muthus success there. His soundtracks are known in the Tamil Nadu film industry and abroad for his versatility in combining Western classical music, Carnatic and Tamil traditional and folk-music traditions, jazz, reggae and rock music. The soundtrack for Bombay sold 15 million copies worldwide, and "Bombay Theme" would later reappear in his soundtrack for Deepa Mehta's Fire and a number of compilations and other media. It was featured in the 2002 Palestinian film Divine Intervention and the 2005 Nicolas Cage film, Lord of War. Rangeela, directed by Ram Gopal Varma, was Rahman's Bollywood debut. Successful scores and songs for Dil Se.. and the percussive Taal followed. Sufi mysticism inspired "Chaiyya Chaiyya" from the former film and "Zikr" from his soundtrack album for Netaji Subhas Chandra Bose: The Forgotten Hero (which featured elaborate orchestral and choral arrangements).

Rahman's soundtrack album for the Chennai production Minsaara Kanavu won him his second National Film Award for Best Music Direction and a South FilmFare Award for Best Music Direction in a Tamil film in 1997, the latter setting a record of six consecutive wins; he later went on to win the award three consecutive additional times. The musical cues in the soundtrack albums for Sangamam and Iruvar used Carnatic vocals, the veena, rock guitar and jazz. During the 2000s, Rahman composed scores and popular songs for Rajiv Menon's Kandukondain Kandukondain, Alaipayuthey, Ashutosh Gowariker's Swades, Rang De Basanti and songs with Hindustani motifs for 2005's Water. Rahman has worked with Indian poets and lyricists such as Javed Akhtar, Gulzar, Vairamuthu and Vaali, and has produced commercially successful soundtracks with directors Mani Ratnam and S. Shankar (Gentleman, Kadhalan, Indian, Jeans, Mudhalvan, Nayak, Boys, Sivaji, Enthiran, I and 2.0).

In 2005 Rahman expanded his Panchathan Record Inn studio by establishing AM Studios in Kodambakkam, Chennai, creating the most cutting-edge studio in Asia. The following year he launched his own music label, KM Music, with his score for Sillunu Oru Kaadhal. Rahman scored the Mandarin-language film Warriors of Heaven and Earth in 2003 after researching and using Chinese and Japanese classical music, and won the Just Plain Folks Music Organization|Just Plain Folks Music Award For Best Music Album for his score for 2006's Varalaru (God Father). He co-scored Shekhar Kapur's second British film, Elizabeth: The Golden Age, in 2007 and received a Best Composer Asian Film Award nomination at the Hong Kong International Film Festival for his Jodhaa Akbar score. Rahman's music has been sampled for other scores in India, appearing in Inside Man, Lord of War, Divine Intervention and The Accidental Husband.

His score for his first Hollywood film, the 2009 comedy Couples Retreat, won the BMI London Award for Best Score. Rahman's music for 2008's Slumdog Millionaire won a Golden Globe and two Academy Awards (a first for an Asian), and the songs "Jai Ho" and "O... Saya" from its soundtrack were internationally successful. His music on 2008's Bollywood Jaane Tu... Ya Jaane Na was popular with Indian youth; that year, his score and songs for Jodhaa Akbar won critical acclaim, a Best Composer Asian Film Award nomination and IIFA awards for best music direction and score.

In 2010, Rahman composed the original score and songs for the romantic Vinnaithaandi Varuvaayaa, the sci-fi romance Enthiran and Danny Boyle's 127 Hours, composing for the Imtiaz Ali musical Rockstar; the latter's soundtrack was a critical and commercial success. In 2012 Rahman composed for Ekk Deewana Tha and the American drama People Like Us, and collaborated with director Yash Chopra on Jab Tak Hai Jaan. all were positively received. By the end of the year his music for Mani Ratnam's Kadal topped the iTunes India chart for December. In 2013, Rahman had two releases: Raanjhanaa and Maryan. Both were successful, with the former nominated for a number of awards and the latter the iTunes India Tamil Album of 2013.

The year 2014 was one of the busiest years for Rahman, with him claiming to have worked in 12 films in various languages. While his first release for the year was the Imtiaz Ali's road movie Highway which garnered positive reviews, his very next release was the performance captured animation film Kochadaiiyaan, a Rajinikanth starrer directed by Soundarya Rajinikanth. The film's soundtrack was long-listed at the forthcoming Academy Awards. His next were the scores for the two back to back Hollywood films, Million Dollar Arm and The Hundred Foot Journey, both of which got into the contended list for the original score category nomination at the Oscars.

Then he composed for the period drama Kaaviya Thalaivan teaming up with director Vasanthabalan for the first time. His next release was Shankar's thriller I and K. S. Ravikumar's period action film Lingaa.

Background scores
His background scores are often characterised by the usage of subtle orchestration and ambient sounds. He often employs contemporary instruments such as Guitars, Cello, Flute, Strings, Keyboard, Finger board, Harpejji, Santoor and traditional Indian instruments such as Shehnai, Sitar, Mrudangam, Veenai & Tabla to create scores.

Some of the films which fetched him appreciations for background scores include Roja, Bombay, Iruvar, Minsara Kanavu, Dil Se.., Taal, Lagaan, The Legend of Bhagat Singh, Swades, Rang De Basanti, Bose: The Forgotten Hero, Guru, Jodhaa Akbar, Raavanan, Vinnaithaandi Varuvaayaa, Rockstar, Enthiran, Kadal, Kochadaiiyaan and I. A. R. Rahman received two Academy Awards for Slumdog Millionaire and two Academy Award nominations for 127 Hours. Recently, his scores for Kochadaiiyaan, Million Dollar Arm and The Hundred-Foot Journey have been nominated in the long list released by Academy of Motion Picture Arts and Sciences. In 2017 his Mersal music's background score has impressed one and all. In 2018, Rahman got national award for the background score of Mom.

Qutub-E-Kripa an ensemble of young musicians of KM Music Conservatory, have been co-credited alongside A. R. Rahman for the background scores of films such as 24, O Kadhal Kanmani, Tamasha, OK Jaanu, Kaatru Veliyidai, Mom, Chekka Chivantha Vaanam, Sarkar and 2.0. They have also scored for the Netflix Show, Daughters of Destiny.

Performing and other projects

Rahman has also been involved in non-film projects. Vande Mataram, an album of original compositions released for India's 50th anniversary of its independence in 1997, is one of India's best-selling non-film albums. He followed it with an album for the Bharat Bala–directed video Jana Gana Mana, a collection of performances by leading exponents and artists of Indian classical music. Rahman has written advertising jingles and orchestrations for athletic events, television and Internet media, documentaries and short films, frequently using the Czech Film Orchestra and the Chennai Strings Orchestra.

In 1999, Rahman partnered with choreographers Shobana and Prabhu Deva and a Tamil film-dancing troupe to perform with Michael Jackson in Munich, Germany at his Michael Jackson and Friends concert. In 2002 he composed the music for his first stage production, Bombay Dreams, which was commissioned by Andrew Lloyd Webber. The Finnish folk-music band Värttinä collaborated with Rahman on the Toronto production of The Lord of the Rings, and in 2004 he composed  "Raga's Dance" for Vanessa-Mae's album Choreography (performed by Mae and the Royal Philharmonic Orchestra).

Since 2004 Rahman has performed three successful world tours before audiences in Singapore, Australia, Malaysia, Dubai, the United Kingdom, Canada, the United States and India, and has been collaborating with Karen David on her upcoming studio album. A two-disc CD, Introducing A. R. Rahman  (featuring 25 of his Tamil film-score pieces), was released in May 2006 and his non-film album Connections was released on 12 December 2008. Rahman performed at a White House state dinner arranged by US President Barack Obama during an official visit by Indian Prime Minister Manmohan Singh on 24 November 2009.

He is one of over 70 artists on "We Are the World 25 for Haiti", a charity single to raise relief funds in the wake of the 2010 Haiti earthquake. In 2010, Rahman composed "Jai Jai Garvi Gujarat" in honour of the 50th anniversary of the formation of Gujarat State, "Semmozhiyaana Thamizh Mozhiyaam" as part of the World Classical Tamil Conference 2010, and the theme song for the 2010 Commonwealth Games, "Jiyo Utho Bado Jeeto". Rahman began his first world tour, (A. R. Rahman Jai Ho Concert: The Journey Home World Tour) on 11 June 2010 at Nassau Coliseum in New York; 16 cities worldwide were scheduled.

Some of Rahman's notable compositions were performed by the London Philharmonic Orchestra in April 2010. In February 2011 Rahman collaborated with Michael Bolton on Bolton's album, Gems – The Duets Collection, reworking his "Sajna" from Couples Retreat.

On 20 May 2011 Mick Jagger announced the formation of a supergroup, SuperHeavy, with Dave Stewart, Joss Stone, Damian Marley and Rahman; its self-titled album was scheduled for release in September 2011. The album would have Jagger singing on Rahman's composition, "Satyameva Jayate" ("The Truth Alone Triumphs").

In January 2012 the Deutsches Filmorchester Babelsberg announced that it would join KM Music Conservatory musicians for a 100-member concert tour of five Indian cities (Germany and India 2011–2012: Infinite Opportunities), performing Rahman's songs. The marked the centennial of Indian cinema and Babelsberg Studio, the world's oldest film studio.

In Summer 2012 Rahman composed a Punjabi song for the London Olympics opening ceremony, directed by Danny Boyle, part of a medley showcasing Indian influence in the UK. Indian musician Ilaiyaraja's song from the 1981 Tamil-language film Ram Lakshman was also chosen for the medley.

In December 2012 Rahman and Shekhar Kapoor launched Qyuki, a networking site which is a platform for story writers to exchange their thoughts. Cisco invested ₹270 million in the startup, giving it a 17-percent share. Qyuki uses Cisco's cloud infrastructure for the site. On 20 December he released the single "Infinite Love" in English and Hindi, commemorating the last day of the Mayan calendar to spread hope, peace and love. Rahman's 2013 tour, Rahmanishq, was announced on 29 July 2013 in Mumbai. Beginning in Sydney on 24 August, the tour moved to a number of cities in India.

In January 2016, after a long break Rahman performed live in Chennai and for the first time in Coimbatore & Madurai, with a complete Tamil playlist. As the name suggests, Nenje Yezhu (which means rise up) began 2016 with a positive note and with music from the heart. The proceeds of this concert will be used for flood relief in Tamil Nadu and also for creating awareness against cancer, supporting VS Medical Trust outside Chennai.

Rahman released a 19-minute orchestral composition The Flying Lotus  in 2017 featuring the demonetisation. This musical piece is an open interpretation of this major stance against black money which also includes Narendra Modi's speech.

On 15 August 2018, Rahman appeared as the host in the 5-episode series of Amazon Prime Video titled "Harmony".

Rahman launched India's first YouTube Original, ARRived, which aims to find the best singing talent from across country. The series has 13 episodes and the first episode was uploaded on 7 November 2018. Rahman is the main judge and he is accompanied by Shaan, Vidya Vox and Clinton Cerejo.

On 16 January 2019, Maruti Suzuki India Limited launched NEXA Music, a platform where 24 artists will be picked and mentored by Rahman and Clinton Cerejo to create international music in India.

Rahman also appeared as a judge on The Voice. The show began airing on 3 February 2019 on StarPlus. Rahman partnered with Marvel to compose a promotional track titled "Marvel Anthem" in Hindi, Tamil and Telugu for Avengers: Endgame (2019). Rahman has sung and composed the track spiced up with rap and heavy percussion. The lyrics are by Nirmika Singh, and MC Heam (rap). The film's team also walked the red carpet and also took a selfie with over 3,500 audience members.

The Irish rock band U2 collaborated with Rahman to release a single, "Ahimsa", in December 2019. The song was named for the Sanskrit word for non-violence, and lyrically was intended to celebrate the ethnical and spiritual diversity in India. Rahman stated that ahimsa requires courage and strength, and that the song is a celebration of non-violence and peace.

Musical style and impact
Skilled in Carnatic music, Western and Hindustani classical music and the Qawwali style of Nusrat Fateh Ali Khan, Rahman is noted for film songs amalgamating elements of these and other genres, layering instruments from different musical idioms in an improvisational style. During the 1980s Rahman recorded monaural arrangements in common with his musical predecessors, K. V. Mahadevan and Vishwanathan–Ramamoorthy. He has also worked as a pianist in Ilaiyaraaja's troupe for hundreds of movies. In later years his methodology changed, as he experimented with the fusion of traditional instruments with new electronic sounds and technology.

Rahman's musical interests and outlook originate in his love of experimentation. His compositions have an auteuristic use of counterpoint, orchestration and the human voice, melding Indian pop music with a unique timbre, form and instrumentation. With this syncretic style and wide-ranging lyrics, the appeal of Rahman's music crosses classes and cultures in Indian society.

His first soundtrack, for Roja, was listed on Time's all-time "10 Best Soundtracks" in 2005. Film critic Richard Corliss said that the composer's "astonishing debut work parades Rahman's gift for alchemizing outside influences until they are totally Tamil, totally Rahman", and his initial global success is attributed to the South Asian diaspora. Music producer Ron Fair considers Rahman "one of the world's great living composers in any medium".

Director Baz Luhrmann said: 

Rahman introduced 7.1 surround sound technology to South Indian films. Rahman is one of the best-selling music artists in India, with an estimated 150 million records sold worldwide. On 21 May 2014 Rahman announced that he has partnered with former Black Eyed Peas' Will.i.am to recreate an early popular track 'Urvashi Urvashi'. Track is 'Birthday'.

Personal life

Rahman is married to Saira Banu (not to be confused with actress Saira Banu), sister-in-law of actor Rahman; they have three children: Khatija, Rahima and Ameen. Ameen has sung "NaNa" from Couples Retreat, and Khatija has sung "Pudhiya Manidha" from Enthiran. Composer G. V. Prakash Kumar is the son of Rahman's elder sister, A. R. Reihana. Rahman's younger sister, Fathima, heads his music conservatory in Chennai. The youngest, Ishrath, has a music studio. A.R. Rahman is co-brother to actor Rahman.

Born Hindu, Rahman converted to Islam when he was in his 20s. After the early death of his father, his family experienced difficult times; Sufism influenced his mother, who was a practising Hindu and, eventually, his family. During the 81st Academy Awards ceremony Rahman paid tribute to his mother: "There is a Hindi dialogue, mere pass ma hai, which means 'even if I have got nothing I have my mother here'." He said, "Ella pughazhum iraivanukke" ("All praise to God" in Tamil, a translation from the Quran) before his speech. In February 2020, Rahman was critiqued for his liberal image after Bangladeshi author Taslima Nasreen raised a question about his daughter wearing a burka.

Philanthropy
Rahman is involved with a number of charitable causes. In 2004 he was appointed as the global ambassador of the Stop TB Partnership, a WHO project. Rahman has supported Save the Children India and worked with Yusuf Islam on "Indian Ocean", a song featuring a-ha keyboard player Magne Furuholmen and Travis drummer Neil Primrose. Proceeds from the song went to help orphans in Banda Aceh who were affected by the 2004 Indian Ocean Tsunami. He produced the single "We Can Make It Better" by Don Asian with Mukhtar Sahota. In 2008 Rahman opened the KM Music Conservatory with an audio-media education facility to train aspiring musicians in vocals, instruments, music technology and sound design. The conservatory (with prominent musicians on staff and a symphony orchestra) is located near his studio in Kodambakkam, Chennai and offers courses at several levels. Violinist L. Subramaniam is on its advisory board. Several of Rahman's proteges from the studio have scored feature films. In 2009, he founded Sunshine Orchestra with a vision to introduce India's first symphony orchestra where economically and socially deprived children get free music education by the KM Music Conservatory. He composed the theme music for a 2006 short film for The Banyan to aid poor women in Chennai.

In 2008 Rahman and noted percussionist Sivamani created a song, "Jiya Se Jiya", inspired by the Free Hugs Campaign and promoted it with a video filmed in a number of Indian cities for a cause. In 2017, he announced one heart foundation which would support people from music industry. Rahman announced  Ta Futures, a collaborative culture project that would curate and celebrate the sounds of Tamil Nadu.

In 2019, Rahman performed a Sufi Benefit Concert at the annual New York gala of Pratham, one of the largest non-governmental organisations in India, which focuses on the provision of quality education to India's underprivileged children. Rahman and his ensemble performed the full dinner concert on a pro-bono basis. Afterward, Rahmam wrote on Twitter that his "long time dream of performing #Sufimusic for human causes came true" and thanked attendees for their respect and generosity.

Discography

Filmography

Actor

Producer, writer and director

Performer
 One Heart (2017)

Awards

A six-time National Film Award winner and recipient of six Tamil Nadu State Film Awards, he has fifteen Filmfare Awards and sixteen Filmfare Awards South for his music. Rahman has received a Kalaimamani from the Government of Tamil Nadu for excellence in the field of music, musical-achievement awards from the governments of Uttar Pradesh and Madhya Pradesh and a Padma Shri from the Government of India.

In 2006, he received an award from Stanford University for his contributions to global music. The following year, Rahman entered the Limca Book of Records as "Indian of the Year for Contribution to Popular Music". He received the 2008 Lifetime Achievement Award from the Rotary Club of Madras. In 2009, for his Slumdog Millionaire score, Rahman won the Broadcast Film Critics Association Award, the Golden Globe Award for Best Original Score, the BAFTA Award for Best Film Music and two Academy Awards (Best Original Score and Best Original Song, the latter shared with Gulzar) at the 81st Academy Awards.

He has received honorary doctorates from Middlesex University, Aligarh Muslim University, Anna University in Chennai and Miami University in Ohio. The composer has won two Grammy Awards: Best Compilation Soundtrack Album and Best Song Written for Visual Media. Rahman received the Padma Bhushan, India's third-highest civilian honour, in 2010.

His work in 127 Hours won him Golden Globe, BAFTA, and two Academy Award nominations (Best Original Music Score and Best Original Song) in 2011. Rahman is an Honorary Fellow of the Trinity College of Music.

On 24 October 2014 Rahman was awarded an honorary doctorate from Berklee College of Music during a concert paying tribute to his music featuring an international cast of students. Upon receiving his award he commented that being honoured by Berklee illustrates how his life has come full circle, as at the start of his career, he had planned to study at Berklee before being offered the opportunity to score Roja. During his 7 May 2012 acceptance speech of his honorary doctorate from Miami University in Ohio, Rahman mentioned that he received a Christmas card from the family of the President of the United States and an invitation to dinner at the White House. A street was named in his honour in Markham, Ontario, Canada in November 2013.

On 4 October 2015, the government of Seychelles named A. R. Rahman Cultural Ambassador for Seychelles in appreciation of the "invaluable services contributed to enhance Seychelles' Arts and Culture development."

In January 2018, He has been appointed as the Brand Ambassador of the Sikkim government. A.R. Rahman will promote and project the state's achievements nationally and globally. Rahman was honoured with the Pride of Indian Music award at the first Zee Cine Awards Tamil, held on 4 January 2020 in Chennai.

The UK-based world-music magazine Songlines named him one of "Tomorrow's World Music Icons" in August 2011. For years, he has been regularly listed one among The 500 Most Influential Muslims in the world.

Currently, he is also on the Board of Advisors of India's International Movement to Unite Nations (I.I.M.U.N.).

99 Songs 

99 Songs is a musical romance film co-written and produced by A. R. Rahman, who thus makes his debut in both roles, apart from composing the original score and songs. 
99 Songs is the first Indian soundtrack album to use Dolby Atmos technology, and Rahman became the first Indian artist to create music album of the film in this technology. The film stars debutants Ehan Bhat and Edilsy Vargas, alongside Aditya Seal, Lisa Ray and Manisha Koirala among others portray supporting characters. The film is a sensual story about art and self-discovery of a struggling singer who wants to be a successful music composer.
The background music and soundtrack for the film was composed by A. R. Rahman. 
The full soundtrack was released by Sony Music India on 20 March 2020., which consist of 14 songs included The Oracle (song), Humnawaa & more, each in Hindi, Tamil and Telugu languages & The album received highly positive reviews from critics.

A. R. Rahman said in an interview with Anupama Chopra:

Biographies

See also
 AR Rahman Foundation 
KM Music Conservatory
List of films directed by Mani Ratnam featuring A. R. Rahman
List of Indian winners and nominees of the Golden Globe Awards
List of Indian winners and nominees of the Academy Awards
Qutub-E-Kripa
Sunshine Orchestra
Panchathan Record Inn and AM Studios

References

Bibliography

External links

 
 [ A. R. Rahman] at AllMusic
 [ A. R. Rahman] at Billboard.com
 
A.R. Rahman Interview NAMM Oral History Program (2013)

 
Living people
1967 births
Alumni of Trinity College of Music
Best Original Music BAFTA Award winners
Best Music Direction National Film Award winners
Best Background Score National Film Award winners
Best Original Song Academy Award-winning songwriters
Best Original Music Score Academy Award winners
Indian Tamil people
Tamil musicians
Tamil singers
Tamil playback singers
Bollywood playback singers
Columbia Records artists
Filmfare Awards winners
Filmfare Awards South winners
Golden Globe Award-winning musicians
Golden Globe Award winners
Grammy Award winners
Indian Muslims
Indian male playback singers
Islam in Tamil Nadu
Converts to Islam
Converts to Islam from Hinduism
Indian Sufis
Singers from Chennai
People from Tamil Nadu
Recipients of the Padma Bhushan in arts
Recipients of the Padma Shri in arts
Tamil film score composers
Tamil Nadu State Film Awards winners
Telugu playback singers
Zee Cine Awards winners
Telugu film score composers
Indian Academy Award winners
Jingle composers
Indian male film score composers
SuperHeavy members
Qadiri order